Patlabor, a franchise created by the group Headgear, has been adapted into three anime versions between 1988 and 1992, including the first OVA series Patlabor: The Early Days, Patlabor: The TV Series and its follow up OVA series, Patlabor: The New Files.

In 1988, Sunrise produced a seven-episode OVA series, this was the basis for the two movies that were to follow. After the success of the OVA series, they produced a television series aired on NTV from 1989 to 1990, which was based on the manga by Masami Yuki, and thus it is an alternate re-telling of the Patlabor series. A second OVA series, which was the sequel to the television series was released on the LaserDisc and VHS tapes of the television series, from 1990 to 1992.

All three anime series were licensed in Region 1 format by Central Park Media. They were released onto VHS and DVD. However, CPM had filed for Chapter 11 bankruptcy in April 2009 and ceased operations. In 2013, Maiden Japan had re-licensed the first OVA series and later, the television series on DVD and Blu-ray.

Mobile Police Patlabor: The Early Days 
From 1988 to 1989, the seven-episode OVA series were produced by Sunrise. It is distributed by Bandai Visual and Tohokushinsha Film in Japan and originally Central Park Media and later Maiden Japan in North America. The English dub was produced by Matlin Recording in New York City, New York. The storyline is the start of the Patlabor series, that would be followed by the two Patlabor movies, Patlabor: The Movie and Patlabor 2: The Movie.

The series was released straight to VHS and LaserDisc from April 25, 1988 to June 25, 1989. It was released onto DVD in two volumes on April 20, 2000, and was later re-issued as a box set on May 25, 2007. A Blu-ray box set was released on July 23, 2010.

Patlabor: The TV Series

Patlabor: The New Files

The episodes were released as OVAs alongside the TV series on LaserDisc and VHS from Bandai Visual from November 22, 1990 to June 6, 1992. They were later released on DVD on August 25, 2000 and on Blu-ray on September 24, 2010. Central Park Media licensed the New Files series and released them on to subtitled VHS under the U.S. Manga Corps label. They later released one DVD volume with English audio before releasing a box set containing all 16 episodes. Only four episodes of the series were dubbed, the rest were subtitled only. Maiden Japan has licensed the OVA series and re-released on Blu-ray and DVD on February 17, 2015.

References

Patlabor